Drosophila immigrans is a species of vinegar fly in the family Drosophilidae. Drosophila immigrans is a member of the Immigrans-tripunctata radiation of the subgenus Drosophila. It is related to the Drosophila quinaria and Drosophila testacea species groups, and the fellow Immigrans species group member Drosophila albomicans. Drosophila immigrans has been used in evolutionary studies to understand how viruses evolve with their hosts.

Gallery

References

Further reading

External links

 

immigrans
Articles created by Qbugbot
Insects described in 1921